Ina Rosenberg is the name of:

Ina Rosenberg Garten, American chef and TV presenter
Ina Rosenberg Balin, American actress